Capital One Hall is a performing arts and corporate event facility in Tysons, Virginia. The venue serves as a corporate event center for the nearby headquarters of the Capital One Financial Corporation, as well as a cultural events space for the Tysons East neighborhood.

Capital One Hall has two theaters: the 1,600-seat Main Theater and the 225-seat black box Vault Theater. The larger complex housing the venue also includes a rooftop amphitheater. For events the venue includes the four-story Atrium, designed to fit up to 1,600 people standing or 500 people seated, and a terrace designed to fit up to 450 people standing or 180 people seated

Capital One Hall opened to the public on October 1, 2021 with a performance featuring singer Josh Groban.

Performances
Capital One Hall hosts performances by D.C.-area performing arts organizations including the National Symphony Orchestra, the National Philharmonic and The Washington Ballet. The venue also presents musical theatre touring productions as part of its annual "Broadway in Tysons" series.

References

External links
 

Concert halls in the United States
Music venues in Virginia
Performing arts centers in Virginia
Tysons, Virginia
Capital One